Pir Ilahi Buksh Colony or Pir Elahi Bux Colony or PIB Colony is a neighborhood in the Karachi East district of Karachi, Pakistan. It was previously administered as part of the Gulshan Town borough, which was disbanded in 2011. Pir Ilahi Buksh Colony was named after Pir Ilahi Bux a prominent member of Pakistan Movement and Chief Minister of Sindh.

There are several ethnic groups in Pir Ilahi Buksh Colony including Muhajirs, Gujratis, Hyderabadis, Sindhis, Kashmiris, Seraikis, Pakhtuns, Balochis, Memons, Bohras, Ismailis, Khatris, Chhipas, etc. The population of Gulshan Town is estimated to be nearly one million.

References

External links
Karachi portal (Archived)

Neighbourhoods of Karachi
Gulshan Town